Kojo Adeyemo Annan (born 25 July 1973) is a Ghanaian-Nigerian businessman and son of the late former UN Secretary-General Kofi Annan.

Early life
Kojo Annan was born in Geneva, Switzerland, on 25 July 1973.
Kojo Annan and his sister Ama Annan are from Kofi Annan's first marriage with Titi Alakija, a Nigerian. The couple separated when Kojo Annan was six years old and divorced two years later. After his parents separated, he lived with his father and spent holidays with his mother and sister. Kojo Annan's second name "Adeyemo" means "the crown befits the child" in Yoruba. Kojo Annan is a maternal grandson of Sir Adeyemo Alakija.

Kojo Annan was educated in Wales at the independent Rydal Preparatory School, and in England, at Rendcomb College, where he excelled as a rugby player and subsequently at Keele University. He was also educated in Switzerland.

Career
From 1995 to 1997, Kojo Annan worked in West Africa for the Swiss-based inspection company Cotecna, then as a marketing consultant for the company.

In September 1998, Kojo Annan met with several heads of state and government ministers during the opening session of the U.N. General Assembly. In December, Cotecna won a $4.8 million Oil-for-Food contract.

Kojo Annan, Kofi Annan and Cotecna deny that the younger Annan was involved in the Oil-for-Food contract. Kojo Annan also claimed that connections with Cotecna severed after 1998; however, he continued to be paid by the company until February 2004.

The Second Interim Report by the IIC confirmed that Cotecna indeed won the Oil-for-Food contract fairly and based on merit. The Committee concluded that there was no link between Kofi Annan and the award of Cotecna's contract; and Cotecna has been transparent and cooperative through this investigation.

On 13 December 2004, Kojo Annan claimed that the probe into the Oil-for-Food Programme by U.S. congressional committees was "a witchhunt from day one as part of a broader Republican political agenda."

A January 2005 article in The Sunday Times announced that he had confessed involvement in the UN Oil-for-Food Programme scandal; in a libel settlement eleven months later, the paper announced that it now "entirely accepts that the allegation was untrue."

Megadeth's front-man Dave Mustaine, mentioned Kojo Annan in the song "United Abominations", the title track of Megadeth's 2007 studio release. This song, based on the UN, sparked an official retort from the UN on 10 July by Mark Leon Goldberg of the United Nations affairs blog, UN Dispatch, who posted a rebuttal based on the accusations Mustaine made in the song.

In April 2016, he was listed in a leaked confidential document, the Panama Papers, revealing his use of offshore accounts.

Kojo Annan currently holds interest in a number of start-ups and has founded Africa10 in 2016, a social enterprise focusing on the development of African youth through sports and education

Personal life 
In March 2014, it was reported that Kojo Annan had married Shanthi Wilkinson.
He has two sons, born 2015 and 2018. He is the nephew of Ghanaian diplomat Kobina Annan.

References

Alumni of Keele University
1973 births
Living people
Businesspeople from Geneva
People educated at Rendcomb College
Kofi Annan
Ghanaian people of Nigerian descent
Ghanaian people of Yoruba descent
Yoruba people
Swiss people of Nigerian descent
Swiss people of Ghanaian descent
Swiss people of Yoruba descent
People named in the Panama Papers
Alakija family